Mason County is a rural county located on the Edwards Plateau in the U.S. state of Texas. At the 2020 census, its population was 3,953. Its county seat is Mason. The county is named for Fort Mason, which was located in the county.

History

 Original inhabitants Lipan Apache, Comanches
 1847 Meusebach–Comanche Treaty
 1851, July 6 – Fort Mason is established.
 1858, January 22 – Mason County, named for Fort Mason, is established by an act of Texas state legislature. First post offices are established.
 1860 Population of 630 includes 18 slaves.
 1861,
 February – County, spurred in part by anti-slavery sentiments of German residents, overwhelmingly votes against secession from the Union.
 March – Fort Mason surrendered to the Confederacy, who leave it mostly vacant and thereby cause an uptick in Indian attacks on the area.
 May 20 – Voters select town of Mason as County Seat.
 1866–1868 Federal troops occupy Fort Mason, only to eventually abandon it.
 1869 Courthouse and jail are erected.
 1870  May 16 – Herman Lehmann and brother Willie are captured by Apaches, but Willie escapes within days.
 1870–1898 The county had four women homesteaders: Louisa J. Hendryx, Mahala Hunnicutt, Sarah E. Morris and Priscilla Sparks
 1875–1877
 County’s first newspaper begins publication.
 Hoo Doo War over cattle rustling.
 Most famous participant in the war is Johnny Ringo, who on September 25, 1875, kills James Cheyney.
 Courthouse fire destroys all records.
 1878, May 12 – Herman Lehmann, escorted by soldiers, finally returns to his family.
 1880s Manganese is discovered. Wakefield Company opens Spiller mines. Iron ore is discovered.  Prospecting begins for gold, silver and coal.
 1882–83 Hereford cattle are introduced into the county. Provisions made for county wide road work.
 1887 The county petitions for state aid for needy residents.
 1890s County places a bounty on wolves, wildcats and mountain lions.
 1902 Mason installs its first telephone in the county judge's office.
 1918 October 3 – Eighteen months after United States Congress declares war on Germany, the Mason County Council of Defense draws up resolution to abandon the use of the German language in the county. The majority of County residents are of German heritage.
 1919 First oil and gas lease in the county. Construction begins on the Mason County section of the Puget Sound-to-the-Gulf Highway.
 1920s Radios come to Mason County.
 1938 Pedernales Electric Cooperative is formed to provide rural electrification. Mason County joins in June.
 1946 Local soil-conservation board organized. County schools consolidated.
 2021 Mason County Courthouse (Texas), constructed in 1909, burns down as a result of arson.

Geography

Major highways
  U.S. Highway 87
  U.S. Highway 377
  State Highway 29
  State Highway 71

Adjacent counties
 McCulloch County (north)
 San Saba County (northeast)
 Llano County (east)
 Gillespie County (south)
 Kimble County (southwest)
 Menard County (west)

Demographics

Note: the US Census treats Hispanic/Latino as an ethnic category. This table excludes Latinos from the racial categories and assigns them to a separate category. Hispanics/Latinos can be of any race.

At the 2000 census, there were 3,738 people, 1,607 households and 1,110 families residing in the county. The population density was 4 per square mile (2/km2). There were 2,372 housing units at an average density of 2 per square mile (1/km2). The racial makeup of the county was 91.60% White, 0.13% Black or African American, 0.62% Native American, 0.05% Asian, 0.03% Pacific Islander, 5.75% from other races, and 1.82% from two or more races. 20.95% of the population were Hispanic or Latino of any race.

There were 1,607 households, of which 25.90% had children under the age of 18 living with them, 59.10% were married couples living together, 7.70% had a female householder with no husband present, and 30.90% were non-families. 29.20% of all households were made up of individuals, and 17.90% had someone living alone who was 65 years of age or older. The average household size was 2.31 and the average family size was 2.83.

22.40% of the population were under the age of 18, 4.70% from 18 to 24, 20.70% from 25 to 44, 28.80% from 45 to 64, and 23.50% who were 65 years of age or older. The median age was 47 years. For every 100 females there were 92.40 males. For every 100 females age 18 and over, there were 87.60 males.

The median household income was $30,921 and the median family income was $39,360. Males had a median income of $28,125 compared with $20,000 for females. The per capita income was $20,931. About 10.10% of families and 13.20% of the population were below the poverty line, including 20.50% of those under age 18 and 13.30% of those age 65 or over.

Communities

City
 Mason (county seat)

Unincorporated communities
 Art
 Fredonia
 Grit
 Hedwigs Hill
 Hilda
 Katemcy
 Loyal Valley
 Pontotoc

Notable people
 J. Marvin Hunter (1880–1957): Born in Mason County. Historian, journalist, printer of the American West, founder of Frontier Times magazine and the Frontier Times Museum in Bandera
 Anna Mebus Martin (1820–1864): Chartered the Commercial Bank of Mason, wealthy business woman and rancher.
 Louis (Ludwig) Martin (1820–1864): Co-founder of Hedwigs Hill, Mason County Justice of the Peace.
 Governor Coke Stevenson (1888–1975): Born in Mason County.
 Leonie von Meusebach–Zesch (1882–1944): Born in Mason County. Pioneer dentist.
 Gene Zesch (1932–) Sculptor
 Fred Gipson (February 7, 1908 – August 14, 1973), author of Old Yeller

Politics

See also

 Adelsverein
 German Texan
 Honey Creek
 List of museums in Central Texas
 Meusebach Homesite
 National Register of Historic Places listings in Mason County, Texas
 Recorded Texas Historic Landmarks in Mason County
 Spy Rock

References

External links
 Library of Congress Historic American Buildings Survey (Mason Co)
 Mason County government's website
 
 Texas Beyond History, Honey Creek

 
1858 establishments in Texas
Populated places established in 1858
German-American history
Texas Hill Country